Fiz Dobbs   (also Stape and Brown) is a fictional character from the British ITV soap opera Coronation Street. Portrayed by Jennie McAlpine, the character first appeared on screen on 20 April 2001. Initially appearing for five episodes, McAlpine's contract was soon extended and Fiz became a regular character. In May 2014, it was announced that McAlpine was expecting her first child and Fiz temporarily departed on 14 November 2014, returning on 19 June 2015. In November 2017, McAlpine took a break from filming to take part in the 17th series of the ITV reality show I'm A Celebrity...Get Me Out of Here! and her exit aired on 18 December 2017, she returned on 2 March 2018. In April 2018, McAlpine announced that she is expecting her second child; she took maternity leave from the show on 5 December 2018 and returned on 30 August 2019.

Fiz initially appeared as a troubled teenager briefly fostered by Roy (David Neilson) and Hayley Cropper (Julie Hesmondhalgh) at the age of 16. She later started working at the Underworld factory. Fiz was involved in a murder storyline in which her husband John Stape (Graeme Hawley) committed three murders and had Fiz help him bury the bodies. She had to implicate other people in order to cover for John. She gave birth to her daughter Hope prematurely, in the live 50th anniversary episode with McAlpine becoming the first actress to act out a birth live on a soap opera.

Storylines

Fiz's first appearance was as a troubled sixteen-year-old fostered by Roy (David Neilson) and Hayley Cropper (Julie Hesmondhalgh). Her boisterous attitude clashes with the pair and Roy gets angry with her when she starts a small fire in the flat while cooking chips. Fiz claims Roy hit her; the claim is quickly dismissed and Fiz is sent to another foster family. Fiz reappears a few months later, having dropped out of school, and gets a job as a machinist at Mike Baldwin's (Johnny Briggs) factory. She is initially dismissive of Roy and Hayley, but when Hayley is held on remand for kidnapping Wayne Hayes (Gary Damer), a boy the Croppers were trying to save from his abusive stepfather, she changes her mind, recognising the Croppers are the only parental figures who truly cared for her, and takes it upon herself to look after Roy in Hayley's absence.

Fiz made her interest in Tyrone Dobbs (Alan Halsall) clear, kissing him. When his fiancé, Maria Sutherland (Samia Ghadie), found out, she broke up with him, and Tyrone and Fiz became a couple. When Terry Duckworth (Nigel Pivaro), the son of Tyrone's surrogate parents Jack (Bill Tarmey) and Vera (Elizabeth Dawn), is arrested on a false assault charge after coming out of hiding to take Jack to hospital, Fiz sells the story to the newspapers. The Duckworths are initially angry but it results in a witness coming forward to clear Terry. Fiz convinces Mike to use some designs she has done at the factory but she has accidentally plagiarised other designers and Mike sacks her. She stages a topless protest on the roof of the factory, which results in her getting her job back but sees Tyrone break up with her.

Fiz is nearly arrested on a trip to Blackpool with Tyrone, Kirk Sutherland (Andrew Whyment) and Jason Grimshaw (Ryan Thomas), since unknown to the others Kirk has broken into the caravan they are using. When Maria leaves town, Fiz moves into her old room in the flat above the salon, sharing with Toyah Battersby (Georgia Taylor), who soon becomes a close friend. She sleeps with Kirk but believes he would not be interested in a relationship; Toyah manages to convince the pair to become a couple. Maria returns and is unhappy to find herself not only sharing with Fiz but with Kirk in regular attendance. Fiz is caught in the middle when Maria becomes pregnant by Toyah's boyfriend John Arnley (Paul Warriner) and supports her when she has an abortion. Toyah leaves town not long afterwards, after saying a fond farewell to Fiz. Fiz subsequently finds herself called on to play agony aunt to a succession of unlucky in love flatmates: Maria, Candice Stowe (Nikki Sanderson) and Claire Casey (Julia Haworth).

Fiz becomes friends with Les Battersby (Bruce Jones) and is one of the few people to believe he is innocent of assaulting corrupt policeman Mick Hopwood (Ian Gain). Les introduces Fiz and Kirk to his new girlfriend, who turns out to be Fiz's mother Cilla (Wendi Peters). Fiz learns Cilla has left her younger brother Chesney (Sam Aston) home alone and Les brings him to live on the street. When Fiz and Kirk break up, Tyrone declares his interest again. Fiz and Tyrone sleep together but are interrupted by Tyrone serenading her with "The Real Slim Shady". Both Kirk and Tyrone propose: Tyrone hires a horse to do so on horseback, while Kirk steals an expensive ring from a jeweller's. When Fiz finds out, she enlists Tyrone to return the ring secretly and Kirk is let off with a caution. Despite not getting engaged, Fiz reunites with Kirk.

Kirk's parents emigrate and sign their kennel business over to him. He and Fiz move into the adjacent house but Fiz is not happy looking after dogs and soon moves out. Kirk instead employs Molly Compton (Vicky Binns), a girl Fiz bullied at school to cope with being bullied herself. Molly considers taking Kirk off Fiz as payback but ends up dating Tyrone instead. When first Cilla and then Les leave the area, Fiz moves into No. 5 with Kirk and Chesney. Eventually, Fiz is reacquainted with her first boyfriend, John Stape (Graeme Hawley), who is now working at Weatherfield High School. Fiz leaves Kirk, declining his proposal of marriage, and starts dating John, moving back into the salon flat with him.

When John begins an affair with student, Rosie Webster (Helen Flanagan), Fiz thinks he is having an affair with Rosie's mother, Sally (Sally Dynevor), whom he has been teaching. However, the truth is revealed on Christmas Day 2007, when John inadvertently mixes up Fiz and Rosie's presents. When Fiz returns, she is shocked to learn what has happened but bravely decides to move on with her life and applies to be Chesney's guardian. Chesney and his beloved Great Dane, Schmeichel are allowed to return home after Fiz moves into No. 5. Initially, she clashes with Kirk's girlfriend, Julie Carp (Katy Cavanagh). While she is happy that Kirk has moved on, she is unhappy with Julie's attempts to be Chesney's carer, feeling that it is her job. After a few months, they become friends.

Fiz receives numerous unknown phone calls. She discovers that it is ex-boyfriend, John, seeking a reconciliation, but declines his requests. He takes a job with StreetCars so he can be close to her, and buys Chesney a bike for his birthday. Fiz and John become friends again and she soon agrees to give him another chance. However, Fiz ends things when she realises that he wants them to move into his grandmother's house in the countryside. Fiz becomes worried when he constantly claims that he has to go to his grandmother's house to 'feed the cat' and eventually discovers that he is holding Rosie hostage there, supposedly for ruining his relationship with Fiz. Fiz releases Rosie, and John is arrested for kidnap and false imprisonment. John continues to send Fiz cards and letters while he is on remand, and is eventually sentenced to 2 years in prison. Soon after John's kidnapping of Rosie is revealed, Fiz receives some bad news about Chesney. He and Kirk are visiting Cilla in South Africa (their adventures are shown in Coronation Street: Out of Africa) and Cilla tells Fiz that Chesney has been in an accident. When Fiz arrives, she is very upset to see Chesney in a wheelchair. She is relieved, yet angry, when they tell her that it is a scam to win a Sunshine Families competition with a £500,000 prize. Fiz later returns to Weatherfield.

Fiz decides that she still loves John and wants to marry him. She proposes to him by writing a message so that she is allowed into the prison, after talking about him being on suicide watch. Fiz is allowed to see John briefly and as he is led away, Fiz asks him if he will marry her. John instantly agrees. John later sends Fiz his grandmother's engagement ring and a visiting order. She sees him and he places the engagement ring on her finger. Fiz and John marry on 28 September 2009. The wedding is held in the prison chapel but Fiz cannot go through with the ceremony without Chesney's support, revealing that all of their friends and neighbours are against the marriage. John does his best to persuade Fiz to go ahead regardless but she refuses, walking out and collapsing in tears outside the prison. Just as it seems that Fiz's big day is doomed, Chesney arrives with Roy and Hayley. He apologises to Fiz and he is there when Fiz and John marry.

Fiz is shocked to hear of the letters that John has written to the Street residents, informing them that he will soon be released and asks for their backing to live there with Fiz. The street is split down the middle: for instance, the Croppers agree, but Eddie Windass (Steve Huison) (despite never having met John and baked his and Fiz's wedding cake) is against it. When Sally learns of the letters, she is left fuming and angrily organises a protest meeting in The Rovers for that evening. At the meeting, Sally gives a speech against John, wanting residents to write back and refuse his request, which Dev Alahan (Jimmi Harkishin) completely backs. However, Roy fights John's corner, with Ken Barlow (William Roache) pointing out that John is entitled to live wherever he wants and Graeme Proctor (Craig Gazey) outright supports him, to the disgust of Blanche Hunt (Maggie Jones). As Norris Cole (Malcolm Hebden) expresses his neutralness, Fiz gives an impassioned speech about how John is sorry and wants to set things right, pointing out how Sally and Rosie have been compensated for John's actions. Fiz's speech is applauded by the majority of residents, much to the disgust of Sally and Dev. The residents all write back, with the overwhelming majority agreeing to let him return to Weatherfield. In mid-November, John is released.

Sally, furious that John has moved back to the street, paints the windows of No. 5 black during the night. Fiz, furious, wants to phone the police - particularly after Sally admits what she has done in front of witnesses - but John refuses. He and Fiz spend the day scraping the paint off and accept Graeme's help in repainting the upstairs of the house to match. Rosie does not seem to care that he is living across the street until, swindled out of her compensation by Luke Strong (Craig Kelly), the acting owner of Underworld whom she had been having a fling with, she tells John that she has decided to return to college and study to be a doctor. She asks him for £50,000 to fund this and is stunned when he refuses so she tries blackmailing him, claiming that he had grabbed her and locked her in Roy's Rolls, where he is now working. Sally and Kevin call the police and John is arrested but released pending further inquiries. That night in the pub, he challenges Rosie about her version of events and, when unable to answer his questions, she reveals that she has lied. Furious, Kevin orders her to apologise the next day and withdraw her statement to the police. Sally also apologises to John and Fiz and asks them not to press charges. John agrees but Fiz is openly angry. The Stapes and the Websters both agree to stay out of each other's way.

John meets one of his ex-teacher colleagues, Colin Fishwick (David Crellin), in the café, who invites him and Fiz to his leaving party before he emigrates to Canada. Whilst at the party, Colin makes it clear to John that he wants to stop teaching.  John thinks up a plan to start teaching again himself, by stealing Colin's identity as he has a clean CRB. Fiz is initially incredulous when John tells her about his plans but, because she loves John, she soon weakens and agrees to go along with his plan. They both agree to keep the truth from Chesney, who has not been particularly fond of John since his affair with Rosie. Eventually, Fiz sees what risk John is taking and they begin to row. Fiz later leaves to go on holiday, alone. Fiz returns from her holiday and announces that she is 12 weeks pregnant with their first child. The couple make up and John promises to never lie to her again. Fiz goes into labour only six months into her pregnancy following injury in the explosion of Nick Tilsley (Ben Price) and Leanne Battersby's (Jane Danson) bar, The Joinery, so she is sent to hospital and gives birth to a baby girl, whom she names Hope. Straight after her birth, Hope is transferred into an incubator as she is three months premature. Due to her prematurity, her immune system is failing and is diagnosed with an infection. Fiz is told that Hope will need a transfusion in order to fight the infection. John has a breakdown following his involvement in three deaths, unbeknownst to Fiz. Fiz is left at home alone with baby Hope, who has now been allowed to leave the hospital. Joy Fishwick (Doreen Mantle), Colin's mother, asked her solicitor to track down her son before her death, and "Colin" is tracked at Number 5. Horrified, Fiz forces herself to pretend to be Mrs. Fishwick. The solicitor informs Fiz of Joy's death and that she has left her fortune to Colin. John returns home in March 2011 and things seem to look up, but John realises all of the new things that Fiz has bought, which she dishonestly explains are from money she received when the factory girls had a whip-round for her. In April 2011, John decides to stop taking his medication, despite Dr. Matt Carter's (Oliver Mellor) objection. Joy's solicitor turns up at No. 5, with Fiz having to pose as Mrs. Fishwick again. The solicitor reveals that Joy's house had been sold and the money is to be transferred into Fiz's (i.e. Mrs. Fishwick's) bank account. John is furious with Fiz for what she has done, thinking it is all over for him. John suffers another breakdown, locking himself in the bookies, after which he runs away. Peter Barlow (Chris Gascoyne) and Dr. Carter suggest that they call the police, but Fiz, knowing the potential imprisonment of both her and John, decides to wait and see if he returns.

The police arrive at Fiz's home to notify her and Chesney that John had been caught on CCTV boarding a ferry at Holyhead. Eventually, Fiz confesses her role in the crime and so the police arrest Fiz for Colin's murder. At the police station, Fiz is interviewed for the murder. She is taken into custody but is released and then attends magistrates' court. The incident is deemed too serious, so she is sent to Crown Court. Fiz is charged with three murders after John flees the country to Ireland. Fiz is remanded in custody and faces trial at Crown court. Fiz is denied bail and is sent straight to prison to await trial. Fiz struggles with life in prison and to cope without Hope, who has been left in the care of Roy and Hayley. She is offered a place in the Mother and Baby unit, but refuses as she feels it is no place to bring her baby up. She becomes even more distressed when she is forced to do some cleaning in the mother and baby unit, as seeing other mums with their babies upsets her and reminds her of her daughter. Fiz soon changes her mind and requests a place in the unit, but is forced to wait. Horrified when she finds her cellmate, Ginny Portis (Ashley McGuire), unconscious from a drug overdose, Fiz is shocked to discover that her friend Ruth Walsh (Rebecca Callard) has supplied the drugs. When Fiz plans to reveal Ruth's drug supply to the governor, Ruth threatens to make her life a misery. Fiz eventually gets a place in the mother and baby unit, but is beaten up by Ruth and other girls when Ruth is removed from the unit for dealing drugs. Ruth and her friends continue to torment Fiz. After Ruth trashes her room, Fiz stands up to her and tells her to keep away from she and Hope. Upon learning the date of Fiz's trial, it is revealed to the audience that John has returned. Spotting Rosie from his car, who is trying to sell her boyfriend Jason's flat, he poses as a potential buyer named Mr. Chips. He turns up at the flat and ties Rosie up, insisting that it is all her fault that he and Fiz are so miserable and trying to force her to turn up at the court and tell them that it is John who is responsible for the deaths, allowing him to release Fiz but not go to prison himself. His plan fails, however, and he has to drive away at a high speed and crashes his car.

Fiz's trial begins and she provides her evidence before the jury leave to consider their verdicts. Fiz is found not guilty of the murders of Joy and Charlotte Hoyle (Becky Hindley), but the jury find her guilty of Colin's murder. Fiz later learns that John has returned, but is in a critical condition in hospital after his car accident. Fiz goes to the hospital and tells John that she forgives him for everything he has done. John gives the police his statement and he then dies from his injuries. Fiz then breaks down in tears and whispers to him that he will always be "her John". Unfortunately, John was too late. Fiz is sentenced to life imprisonment, with a minimum term of 15 years. Fiz and Chesney are devastated. Fiz asks Chesney to organise John's funeral. He initially refuses, but after his girlfriend, Katy Armstrong (Georgia May Foote), convinces him to, he agrees. Chesney later receives a phone call from Fiz saying that she has been granted bail before her review. Fiz later begins a feud with Kirsty Soames (Natalie Gumede) after she nearly slices Fiz's fingers off at work using a sewing machine. When Kirsty later attacks Fiz in her own home, Fiz realises that Kirsty is beating up her fiancé Tyrone. Fiz helps Tyrone through his dilemma with Kirsty but ends up developing feelings for him and they begin an affair. When Kirsty beats up Tyrone again, Fiz advises Tyrone to marry Kirsty so he can gain custody of his daughter Ruby. Kirsty accepts Tyrone's proposal but discovers Fiz and Tyrone's affair the day before the wedding. She humiliates the pair at the church, as many of the residents watch as Kirsty reveals Fiz is Tyrone's mystery lover. During an argument at the top of the stairs, Kirsty attempts to hit Tyrone again but ends up falling down the stairs. Fiz, Tommy Duckworth (Chris Fountain), Eileen Grimshaw (Sue Cleaver), Sean Tully (Antony Cotton) and Paul Kershaw (Tony Hirst) race round to the house to see what has happened, and Kirsty tells the police that Tyrone has been abusing her for months. Tyrone is arrested, which devastates Fiz. Tyrone's court hearing arrives, and Kirsty's mother Alison (Dawn Hope) tries to persuade Kirsty to tell the truth, but she refuses. After Kirsty assaults Julie, Kirsty confesses to the jury that she has been beating Tyrone. Tyrone is freed and Kirsty is sent to prison.

Fiz is later distraught to hear that Hayley has been diagnosed with pancreatic cancer. There is further devastation when Fiz is told that Hayley's tumour is terminal, and only has six to twelve months to live. Fiz promises Hayley that she will take care of Roy after she has died. Fiz and Tyrone are present at Roy's birthday party in The Rovers on 20 September 2013, and Fiz asks Hayley and Roy whether they would like to spend more time with Hope and Ruby, which they both accept gladly. Fiz is puzzled when Hayley walks out on Roy and moves in with her and Tyrone. Unknown to Fiz, Hayley has recently told Roy that when her cancer spreads, she intends on ending her own life. While Fiz and Tyrone are at work, Hayley collapses at home and when Fiz returns, she calls for an ambulance. She accompanies Roy to the hospital and is told that Hayley has an infection. Following the incident, Hayley moves back in with Roy.

In January 2014, Fiz is devastated when she learns from Anna Windass (Debbie Rush) that Hayley has died. Fiz is unaware, however, that Hayley committed suicide after drinking a lethal cocktail. She and Tyrone rush over to the café flat, where Fiz finds Hayley's corpse on the bed with Roy's arm around her. Chesney later arrives, and he, Fiz, Tyrone, Anna and Carla Connor (Alison King) all try to help Roy through his grief. A few days later, Roy is struggling to come to terms with Hayley's death, but Fiz learns that Hayley killed herself, and angrily confronts Roy and shouts at him. Anna tries to get through to Fiz that it is what Hayley wanted and that it was not assisted suicide, but Fiz only listens to Carla. On the day of Hayley's funeral, Fiz, Carla, and Anna try to persuade Roy to attend, as he is refusing. He eventually attends, but in the middle of Fiz's eulogy, Roy stands up and interrupts her speech. He tells the upset residents that Hayley was the love of his life and that he will miss her dearly, which relieves Fiz, Carla, and Anna, as they all thought he was going to tell them about Hayley's suicide. Following the funeral, Roy leaves Fiz and Anna a note explaining that he has gone to visit his mother Sylvia Goodwin (Stephanie Cole) for a while. The pair start to panic, however, when a pipe bursts at the café and realize that Roy has been away for 10 days. They call Sylvia, but her sister Jean answers the phone and explains that she hasn't heard from Roy is six months and that Sylvia is in Tenerife. Fiz calls the police, and they explain Roy's situation, without revealing Hayley's suicide. When the police leave, Fiz and Anna have many arguments about his whereabouts, as Tyrone tries to calm the bickering women down. When they get home, Fiz reveals to a stunned Tyrone that she believes that Roy is dead. In mid-February, Roy returns with no explanation of his whereabouts. He later explains that he has been stopping in a hotel by a steam museum. Fiz is later concerned when Roy doesn't come out of his flat, and that he keeps making continuous trips to the toy shop. It is revealed that he is building a model railway track, which puzzles Fiz, but fascinates Tyrone and Chesney.

In October 2014, Cilla returns to the street and reveals that she is seriously ill, suffering from osteoporosis. Although Fiz is sympathetic towards her mother, Chesney cannot forgive her for the way she treated him as a child, especially when his son, Joseph (Lucca-Owen Warwick), suffers a minor injury, whilst in her care. When Cilla reveals that she has been advised to attend a clinic in Wolverhampton, so that they can help her recover, Fiz decides to go and look after her mother, leaving Hope and Ruby in Tyrone's care. On Christmas Day, Tyrone, Hope, and Ruby go to stay with Fiz and Cilla for a few days and on his return, Tyrone reveals that Hope and Ruby will be staying with Fiz, for a while.

In October 2015, it is revealed Hope is suffering from a type of  childhood cancer called neuroblastoma, plunging Fiz and Tyrone into panic. Hope was eventually cured, but Fiz and Tyrone's insistence to provide a perfect Christmas to her in case it turned out to be her last. This later gave them financial issues.

In August 2019, Hope is referred to a specialist school due to her disruptive behaviour and is home taught by care worker Jade Rowan, who moves in with Fiz and Tyrone. Jade begins to orchestrate incidents with the intention of letting the blame fall on Hope in order to cause a rift between her and Fiz, while manipulating Hope into thinking she is on her side. Jade is later revealed to be the daughter of John Stape and has been attempting to avenge his death, feeling that Fiz caused his downfall and that Hope is not safe with her as a result. She enlists the help of social services in order to have Hope taken away, lying that Hope has been physically abused by Fiz at home. Fiz is subsequently investigated by social services and Hope and Ruby are removed from Fiz and Tyrone's home while they investigated. They were allowed to move back in after a short while so long as Fiz wasn't living in the same home as them. This caused a lot of turmoil for the family, who were desperate to get their lives back on track. Eventually, Tyrone finds a phone that Jade gave to Hope with evidence of Jade manipulating her. Tyrone takes this to social services and after an investigation, the allegations against Fiz are dropped and she is allowed to move back in.

In March 2021, Tyrone confessed to Fiz that he was in love with Alina Pop. They tried to make their relationship work but ultimately they split the following month, with Tyrone moving in with Alina at 2a Coronation Street. The following months were difficult for Fiz, having to deal with Tyrone introducing Alina to their children, her and Tyrone fighting for custody in a short-lived custody battle, Hope setting fire to Tyrone and Alina's flat which resulted in Alina miscarrying and then the stress of Hope's conviction and trial. In July, Fiz met Phill Whittaker (Jamie Kenna) in a chance encounter at the furniture shop and after hitting it off, they went out for a few dates. Despite liking each other, Fiz decided that she wasn't ready to date again which Phill understood. After Hope sets fire to Tyrone and Alina's flat, Fiz finds out that the parents of children in Hope's school have set up a WhatsApp group petitioning for Hope's removal. This deeply upsets Fiz, who feels that no one is fighting her corner or protecting her. Phill re-emerges and suggests that they go and get something to eat to take her mind off it and again they hit it off, but Tyrone seizes the opportunity to gatecrash the date to profess his love for Fiz while Phill is in the loo. This disgusts Fiz, who reminds Tyrone that he is engaged to Alina and that she has moved on and wants a new start.

In May 2022, Fiz and Phill get engaged to be married. They got married in July 2022 but following the wedding, at the reception Fiz ends her relationship with Phill having realised that she loves Tyrone and maybe never loved Phill but thought she did. She and Tyrone reconciled shortly thereafter.

Creation

Fiz initially appeared as a troubled teenager briefly fostered by Roy (David Neilson) and Hayley Cropper (Julie Hesmondhalgh) at the age of fifteen. She leaves and then returns to Coronation Street, and starts working at the Underworld factory. Her nickname is presumably due to her distinctive afro-like hair, however she was born as Fiona. Her mother, Cilla (Wendi Peters) and her little brother, Chesney (Sam Aston) are introduced when they come to live on the street with Les Battersby (Bruce Jones). Fiz has a bad history with her mother, who has often left her in care and never prioritised her children.

The character first appears onscreen during the episode broadcast on 20 April 2001.
The character of Fiz is a good-hearted young woman who has made many puzzling decisions and is often unlucky in love. Actress Jennie McAlpine stated that she would prefer the character to stay unlucky in love because she enjoys portraying the rowing and screaming that comes with it rather than seeing her character living happily ever after. Fiz's personality has taken some rapid transformations over the years. Starting out as a dopey teenage tearaway, she is now responsible for her younger brother, constantly trying to do the right thing by him and sometimes failing. When interviewed about this on the soap opera's official website, McAlpine stated: "I like Fiz, I think she is a good person. I know she does get it wrong sometimes, but she is just trying, she's just trying to get it all right, she doesn't always but she does try." During the same interview she then said: "Oh, Fiz has changed over the years. Luckily she's changed because I don't think I'd be here if she hadn't because she started off being a pretty, pretty bad girl actually, causing loads of trouble for Roy and Hayley."

Development

In November 2012, The Sun newspaper reported that romance will blossom for the old flames as Fiz continues to support Tyrone Dobbs (Alan Halsall) through his domestic violence ordeal with girlfriend Kirsty Soames (Natalie Gumede). It was reported that Kirsty would deliberately cause injury to Fiz's hand, according to the Daily Star, Fiz would attempt to fix her machine at the factory when it breaks only to get her hand trapped when Kirsty switches the power back on. Fiz apparently needs emergency medical attention due to the bloody injury and soon starts spreading the word that Kirsty harmed her on purpose. She is quoted as telling Tyrone: "Kirsty said she didn't do it and you might believe her, but in your head I don't think you do. What's she going to do next? She injured you and now she's injured me. Who's going to be next, Ruby?" McAlpine spoke about the storyline and told What's On TV: "Kirsty continues to look after Fiz and stays with her while she is treated at the hospital and even returns home with her. She is quite sinister and when she finally leaves, Fiz is quite shaken by Kirsty's behaviour. Fiz has now seen how scary Kirsty can be with her own eyes. Fiz is not soft, she has spent time in prison before, but she has now seen what Tyrone has to cope with when Kirsty gets angry." She added: "Fiz really cares about Tyrone. Fiz is also very stubborn and has a sense of justice. She will probably want to see this through to the end - she wants the truth to come out. She wants Tyrone to be happy and feels this can never be the case while he is still involved with Kirsty."

McAlpine said that her emotional scenes with Hawley (John Stape) were very draining and very hard work. She told The Mirror: "It's been very draining. Not emotionally, because I never take my work home with me, but genuinely physically exhausting. It's tiring having to cry continuously and I take a long time to recover from that. My face goes all red and my eyes sting for ages afterwards. I'm not a good crier!". She added: "I've always been a huge Corrie fan. Being a Northern girl it was always on in my living room. And even today, I love sitting down and catching up with what's going on. This is my dream job."

McAlpine admitted that her wedding plans caused her to receive a mixed reaction from viewers. On This Morning, McAlpine revealed: "It has divided the nation - some people think she's absolutely mad. But it's funny, before I proposed and did that big thing with the banner, everyone was saying, 'Oh, I think you should marry him', and now I've taken the decision into my own hands I don't think they like it now. I think people aren't happy about it now. They liked the idea but now they are worried." McAlpine added: "He didn't mean to do it for five weeks - he didn't mean to lock her up for that long, I know that. I do believe him."

References

External links
Fiz Brown at itv.com

Coronation Street characters
Fictional factory workers
Television characters introduced in 2001
Fictional waiting staff
Fictional machinists
Female characters in television
Fictional prisoners and detainees
Fictional salespeople